Régis de Oliveira (born  September 19, 1944) is a Brazilian lawyer, professor, and politician.  He was mayor of São Paulo from May 26 to June 13, 2000.

A magistrate in the São Paulo state court, he was elected a federal deputy for Brazilian Social Democracy Party in 1994. In 1996 he was elected deputy-mayor of São Paulo for the Liberal Front Party, along with mayor Celso Pitta. In 2000, while a member of the National Mobilization Party, he succeeded to the mayoralty when the São Paulo state court sentenced Pitta to the loss of his office, due to corruption charges stemming from an irregular loan given to him by businessman Jorge Yunes. Appealing the court's decision, Pitta was allowed 18 days later to return to office, pending the outcome of the appeal, and Régis de Oliveira resumed his post as deputy-mayor.

He is now a chaired professor of finance law at the Universidade de São Paulo law school. In 2007, he was again elected federal deputy with a term ending in 2011, now for the Social Christian Party.

References

1944 births
Living people
Mayors of São Paulo
Academic staff of the University of São Paulo
People from Monte Aprazível
Members of the Chamber of Deputies (Brazil) from São Paulo
Brazilian Social Democracy Party politicians
Democrats (Brazil) politicians
Party of National Mobilization politicians
Social Christian Party (Brazil) politicians